Isobar may refer to:
 Isobar (meteorology), a line connecting points of equal atmospheric pressure reduced to sea level on the maps.
 Isobaric process, a process taking place at constant pressure
 Isobar (nuclide), one of multiple nuclides with the same mass but with different numbers of protons (or, equivalently, different numbers of neutrons).

See also
 Isosurface